Arres is a municipality in the comarca of the Aran Valley in Catalonia, Spain, close to the French border. The mayor is Pere Castet i Farré (CDA).

References

External links
 Government data pages 

Municipalities in Val d'Aran